Decimus Junius Brutus may refer to:

Decimus Junius Brutus was consul in 325 BC
Decimus Junius Brutus was consul in 292 BC; he is best known for introducing gladiatorial games to Rome in 264 BC
Decimus Junius Brutus Callaicus (180 BC – 113 BC), led several armies during the Roman conquest of Iberia in the 2nd century BC
Decimus Junius Brutus (consul 77 BC), consul in 77 BC
Decimus Junius Brutus Albinus (died 43 BC), conspirator in the assassination of Julius Caesar, 1st century BC